Istanbul Sabiha Gökçen International Airport  is one of two international airports serving Istanbul, the largest city in Turkey. The facility is named after Sabiha Gökçen, adoptive daughter of Mustafa Kemal Atatürk and the first female fighter pilot in the world.

Overview
The airport was built because Atatürk International Airport (located on the European side) was not large enough to meet the booming passenger demands (both domestic and international). The airport opened on 8 January 2001. In June 2007, Turkish conglomerate Limak Holding, India's GMR Group and Malaysia Airport Holding Berhad (MAHB) consortium gained the contract for upgrading and maintaining the airport. In mid-2008, ground was broken to upgrade the international terminal to handle 25 million passengers annually. The new terminal was inaugurated on 31 October 2009.

SAW's international terminal capacity originally was 3 million passengers per year and the domestic terminal capacity was 0.5 million passengers per year. In 2010, Sabiha Gökçen airport handled 11,129,472 passengers, a 71% increase compared to 2009. The airport was planning (in 2011) to host 25 million passengers by 2023, but has already received and handled more than 35 million passengers by 2019.

In September 2010, the airport was voted the World's Best Airport at the World Low Cost Airlines Congress in London and received the award. The other awards received by the airport in 2010 were: Turkey's Most Successful Tourism Investment 2010, the highly commended award from Routes Europe, and the Airport Traffic Growth Award by Airline News & Network Analysis.

With 28,285,578 passengers and 206,180 aircraft movements in 2015, Sabiha Gökçen International Airport is the third busiest single-runway airport in the world, after Mumbai and London Gatwick. However, both Mumbai and Gatwick actually have two runways and are only considered "single-runway" because they can only operate the second runway if the main one is out of use. This makes Sabiha Gökçen the world's busiest true single-runway airport.

A second runway is currently being built and is expected to be operational towards the end of 2022. The second runway will increase the hourly capacity from 40 to 80 aircraft movements.

Terminals
The new terminal building with a 25 million annual passenger capacity conducts domestic and international flights under one roof. The features and services of the new terminal and its outlying buildings include a four-storey car park with a capacity of about 4,718 vehicles + 72 bus (3.836 indoors and 882 + 72 bus outdoors), a four-storey hotel with 128 rooms, adjacent to the terminal and with separate entrances at air and ground sides, 112 check-in, 24 online check-in counters as well as a VIP building & apron viewing CIP halls with business lounges. There is also a Multi Aircraft Ramp System (MARS), allowing simultaneous service to 8 aircraft with large fuselages (IATA code E) or 16 middle-sized fuselage aircraft (IATA code C) installed. The terminal additionally features a 400 m2 conference center, 5,000 m2 food court, for cafés and restaurants and a duty-free shopping area, with a ground of 4,500 square-meters. At the international departures area, on the airside, an hourly hotel and lounge became operational in January 2020 as well. The airport's cargo terminal has a capacity of 90,000 tons per year and is equipped with 18 cold storage depots.

Airlines and destinations

Passenger

The following airlines operate regular scheduled and charter flights to and from Sabiha Gökçen International Airport:

Cargo

Statistics

Traffic figures

Passenger development

Ground transport

Sabiha Gökçen International Airport is connected to the city of Istanbul and the city's wider metropolitan area through a number of transport options.

Rail
The airport is located 14 km from the Pendik railway station and sea-taxi stations. M10, a metro connection to Marmaray and Yüksek Hızlı Tren via the Pendik station is currently being built.

Metro
The M4 metro line has been extended to the airport.

Shuttlebuses and coaches
Shuttlebuses E10 and E11 serve Taksim and Kadıköy and there are coaches to nearby towns and cities.

Car and taxi
The airport is reachable by car from the E80 (Trans-European Motorway) which passes through the Istanbul Metropolitan Area.

Accidents and incidents
On 23 December 2015 at approximately 2:00 AM, explosions were reported to have occurred in a parked Pegasus Airlines aircraft, killing one cleaner and wounding another inside the plane. Five nearby planes were reported to be damaged as well. The operations were reported to continue normally soon after, however with heightened security measures in place. Three days later, it was reported that terrorist group Kurdistan Freedom Falcons had organized the attack.
On 7 January 2020, a plane operated as Pegasus Airlines flight 747, a Boeing 737-800, suffered a runway excursion after landing. Passengers evacuated the aircraft using slides. No fatalities or injuries occurred.
On 5 February 2020, a Boeing 737-800, registration TC-IZK, operated as Pegasus Airlines Flight 2193, skidded off the end of Runway 06, leading to an airport shutdown. There were 177 passengers and 6 crew on board. Three people were killed, another 179 were injured.

References

^ 40. Hradecky, Simon. "Incident: Pegasus B738 at Istanbul on Jan 7th 2020, runway excursion on landing". Aviation Herald. Retrieved 7 January 2020.

External links

Istanbul Sabiha Gokcen Airport Travel Guide
İstanbul Sabiha Gökçen Havalimanı Arası Kaç Km 
Sabiha Gökçen Take-off and landing Flights
(Turkish)

Airports in Istanbul
Buildings and structures in Istanbul Province
Pendik
Transport in Istanbul Province
Airports established in 2001
2001 establishments in Turkey